The Ever Open Door is a 1920 British silent drama film directed by Fred Goodwins and starring Hayford Hobbs, Daphne Glenne and Margaret Hope. It was based on the play The Ever Open Door by George R. Sims, a leading Victorian writer of stage melodramas. It was one of a number of Sim's plays to be adapted for cinema during the Silent era.

Cast
 Hayford Hobbs - Dick 
 Daphne Glenne - Miriam 
 Margaret Hope - Janet 
 Sydney Wood - Robbie 
 Terence Cavanagh - Honourable John Halstead 
 Ralph Forster - Father Clement

References

Bibliography
 Low, Rachael. The History of British Film, Volume 4 1918-1929. Routledge, 1997.
 Richards, Jeffrey (ed.). The Unknown 1930s: An Alternative History of the British Cinema, 1929- 1939. I.B. Tauris & Co, 1998.

External links

1920 films
British silent feature films
Films directed by Fred Goodwins
1920 drama films
British films based on plays
Ideal Film Company films
British drama films
British black-and-white films
1920s English-language films
1920s British films
Silent drama films